String Quintet No. 2 in G major, Op. 111, is a work by Johannes Brahms composed in 1890 and published in 1891. It is known as the Prater Quintet. Brahms intended it to be his last piece of music, though he later produced a number of piano pieces and the two sonatas for clarinet or viola and piano. The first performance of the Quintet in Vienna on November 11, 1890 was a sensation (Swafford 1997, p. 568).

Like Brahms' earlier string quintet, Opus 88, it is a viola quintet, scored for two violins, two violas and cello. The work has four movements.

Its opening is dominated by a cello solo in G major. The middle section is in G minor, though it passes through numerous keys before returning to G major by the end.

It starts with a viola solo accompanied by cello pizzicato. Then a ghostly triplet motif is presented by the viola. Both of these thematic materials are played by different instruments and developed, with one section combining the triplet and pizzicato motifs with the opening theme. There is a stormy middle section reminiscent of Schubert's cello quintet. The entire movement has a key signature of D minor, but it ends on a D major chord.

The third movement, marked Un poco allegretto, is in  time and is loosely based on a minuet and trio form, finishing with a short coda the uses the material of the trio instead of that of the minuet. The "minuet" section, which is in G minor, is followed by a "trio" section in G major, followed by another "minuet" section (written out) and finally the coda section in the key of the trio.

It displays influences of Hungarian music. The opening theme in the first viola is in B minor, and is copied by the first violin nine bars later. However, a new, upbeat, dance-like theme in G major is presented shortly after in the 1st violin. Many different thematic materials are presented in this movement's exposition, many of which are developed in the intensely fugal development section. After a recap of the original thematic material, there is a large unison scale played forte by all of the instruments right before the stringendo coda. The movement (and the piece) end in G major.

See also 
 String quintet

References 
BRAHMS STREICH-QUINTETT G-dur / G major Opus 111 EDITION PETERS Nr 3905b

External links

Chamber music by Johannes Brahms
Brahms Quintet 2
1890 compositions
Compositions in G major